Pedois lutea is a moth in the family Depressariidae. It was described by Alfred Jefferis Turner in 1927. It is found in Australia, where it has been recorded from Tasmania.

References

Moths described in 1927
Pedois